Fraile Muerto is a town in the Cerro Largo Department of eastern Uruguay. Its name means "Dead Friar".

Geography

Location

History
It was founded on 3 January 1908. Its original name was "Fructuoso Mazziotta", known also as "Wenceslao Silveira". On 17 July 1918 it was renamed to "Fraile Muerto" and its status was elevated to "Pueblo" (village)  by the Act of Ley Nº 6.195 and then raised to "Villa" (town) on 19 December 1957 by the Act of Ley Nº 12.478.

Population
In 2011 Fraile Muerto had a population of 3,168.
 
Source: Instituto Nacional de Estadística de Uruguay

Places of worship
 Most Holy Redeemer Parish Church (Roman Catholic)

References

External links
INE map of Fraile Muerto and Toledo

Populated places in the Cerro Largo Department
Populated places established in 1908
1908 establishments in Uruguay